The following is a list of 2021 UCI Women's Teams and riders for the 2021 women's road cycling season.

World Teams

Alé BTC Ljubljana

Canyon–SRAM

FDJ Nouvelle-Aquitaine Futuroscope

Liv Racing

Movistar Team

SD Worx

Team BikeExchange

Team DSM

Trek–Segafredo

Continental Teams

A.R. Monex Women's Pro Cycling Team

Arkéa Pro Cycling Team

Andy Schleck–CP NVST–Immo Losch

Aromitalia–Basso Bikes–Vaiano

Bepink

Bingoal Casino–Chevalmeire

Bizkaia–Durango

Born to win G20 Ambedo

Burgos Alimenta Women Cycling Sport

CAMS–Tifosi

Ceratizit–WNT Pro Cycling

China Liv Pro Cycling

Cogeas–Mettler–Look

DNA Pro Cycling

Doltcini–Van Eyck–Proximus

Drops–Le Col

Eneicat–RBH Global–Martín Villa

GT Krush Tunap

InstaFund Racing

Isolmant–Premac–Vittoria

Lotto–Soudal Ladies

Lviv Cycling Team

Massi–Tactic Women Team

Minsk Cycling Club

Multum Accountants Ladies Cycling Team

NXTG Racing

Parkhotel Valkenburg Cycling Team

Rally Cycling

Río Miera–Cantabria Deporte

Roxsolt Liv SRAM

Servetto–Makhymo–Beltrami TSA

Sopela Women's Team

Stade Rochelais Charente-Maritime

Team Hitec Products

Team Illuminate

Team Jumbo–Visma

Team Rupelcleaning–Champion Lubricants

Tibco–Silicon Valley Bank

Top Girls Fassa Bortolo

Valcar–Travel & Service

WCC Team

References

2021